"The Reaper's Image" is a horror short story by American writer Stephen King, first published in Startling Mystery Stories in 1969 and collected in Skeleton Crew in 1985.  The story is about an antique mirror haunted by the visage of the Grim Reaper, who appears to those who gaze into it.

Plot summary

The story concerns a visit by an antique collector, Johnson Spangler, to the Samuel Claggert Museum in his attempt to buy the legendary Delver's Mirror. The museum curator, Mr. Carlin, ushers Spangler through the building, recounting the history of this rare Elizabethan mirror, which has been plagued by incidents of attempted destruction. The museum curator also explains the infamous history of the mirror, recounting all the people who have looked into the mirror had mysteriously disappeared.

Carlin tells a skeptical Spangler that an image of the Grim Reaper is rumored to appear in the mirror, standing close to the viewer. Spangler scoffs, but feels unnatural horror when he looks into the mirror and claims to see some duct tape in the mirror's corner. He angrily confronts Carlin, who claimed the mirror was undamaged. Carlin claims however that there is no duct tape, and that Spangler is "seeing the reaper." When Spangler runs his hand over the "duct tape", he feels a smooth surface rather than the rough outside of the tape. When Spangler looks again, the duct tape is gone. As Carlin relates the history of a high school boy who saw the Reaper and disappeared without a trace, Spangler becomes ill and rushes out of the second floor. Mr. Carlin remains behind to wait... and wait.

See also
 Stephen King short fiction bibliography

External links
The story at HorrorKing.com

Short stories by Stephen King
1969 short stories
Horror short stories
Fiction about personifications of death
Works originally published in American magazines
Works originally published in mystery fiction magazines